Paulo Roberto de Oliveira Júnior (born 11 August 1977) is a Brazilian retired footballer who played as a forward.

External links
Pattaya United Squad

1977 births
Living people
Brazilian footballers
Association football forwards
Paulo Roberto
Expatriate footballers in Thailand
Brazilian expatriate sportspeople in Thailand
People from São João de Meriti
Sportspeople from Rio de Janeiro (state)